Ivor Hugh Norman Evans (1886–1957) was a British anthropologist, ethnographer and archaeologist who spent most of his working life in peninsular British Malaya (now Malaysia) and in North Borneo (now Sabah, Malaysia).

Life

Evans was educated at Charterhouse School and at Clare College, University of Cambridge, during which time he studied under Alfred Haddon. In 1910–11 he briefly served as a colonial administrator, as cadet district officer for the North Borneo Chartered Company, which administrated the independent state and British protectorate of North Borneo. He was based in the Tempasuk and Tuaran Districts.

Evans spent much of his career on peninsular Malaya from 1912 until 1932 at the Perak State Museum in Taiping, the first museum in Malaysia. He was appointed Curator there in 1917 and also worked as an ethnographer and archaeologist.

Evans took early retirement in 1932 and returned to England, settling at Oulton Broad in Suffolk.  He remained there until 1938.  However, he missed the East and decided to return to Borneo, where he was to spend the rest of his life.  He carried out ethnographic research on the religious beliefs, practices and folklore of the Dusuns of the Kota Belud area.

During the Japanese occupation of Borneo in World War II, Evans was held as a civilian internee at Batu Lintang camp at Kuching in Sarawak.  He died in Labuan on 3 May 1957.

A collection of Evans' material, including diaries and photographs taken on peninsular Malaya and in Borneo are held at the Museum of Archaeology and Anthropology, University of Cambridge (reference GB-1638-MS. Collections, BA5/9/1-7)

Evans left a bequest to Cambridge University which led to the creation of the Evans Research Fellowship and the Evans Fund, to promote anthropological and archaeological research in South East Asia.

Selected works

Books
1922 Among Primitive Peoples in Borneo: A Description of the Lives, Habits, and Customs of the Primitive Headhunters of North Borneo, with an Account of Interesting Objects of Prehistoric Antiquity Discovered in the Island London: Seeley, Service & Co. Limited
1923 Studies in Religion, Folk-Lore, and Custom in British North Borneo and the Malay Peninsula Cambridge: University Press
1927 Papers on the Ethnology and Archaeology of the Malay Peninsula  Cambridge: University Press
1937 The Negritos of Malaya  Cambridge: University Press
1953 The Religion of the Tempasuk Dusuns of North Borneo  Cambridge: University Press

Articles
1912 "Notes on the Religious Beliefs, Superstitions, Ceremonies and Tabus of the Dusuns of the Tuaran and Tempassuk Districts, British North Borneo" The Journal of the Royal Anthropological Institute of Great Britain and Ireland 42 (July – December 1912), 380–396 
1913 "Folk Stories of the Tempassuk and Tuaran Districts, British North Borneo" The Journal of the Royal Anthropological Institute of Great Britain and Ireland  43 (July – December 1913), 422–479 
1917 "Malay back-slang" Journal of the Federated Malay States Museums (JFMSM)  7: 115–116
1917 "Notes on Some Beliefs and Customs of the 'Orang Dusun' of British North Borneo" The Journal of the Royal Anthropological Institute of Great Britain and Ireland  47  (January – June 1917), 151–159 
1918 "Preliminary Report on Cave Exploration near Lenggong, upper Perak" JFMSM 7, 227–234
1918 "The Raja and the Pauper: A Borneo Folk-Tale"  Man 18, (January 1918), 8–9
1918 "A Brass Drum from Borneo" Man 18 (February 1918), 19–20 
1918 "Some Sakai Beliefs and Customs" The Journal of the Royal Anthropological Institute of Great Britain and Ireland  48  (July – December 1918), 179–197 
1920 "Customs of the camphor-hunters" JFMSM 9, 53–58
1920 "Kempunan"  Man 20 (May 1920),  69–70
1921 "A Grave and Megaliths in Negeri Sembilan: an Account of Some Excavations" JFMSM 9
1922 "Further Notes on Negrito Beliefs and Customs"  JFMSM 9
1922 "On an Examination of Negrito Combs from Perak" JFMSM 9
1922 "The Potting Industry at Kuala Tembeling" JFMSM 9, 259 – 261
1922 "A Rock-Shelter at Gunung Pondok" JFMSM 11
1923 "Some Beliefs of the Lenggong Negritos" JFMSM 12
1923 "Vaughan Stevens and the Patterns on Negrito Combs" JFMSM 12
1925 "An Ethnological Expedition to South Siam" JFMSM 12, 35–7
1925 "Further Notes on Pahang Negritos" JFMSM 12
1926 "Results of an Expedition to Kedah" JFMSM 12
1927 "Tukang Bola" JFMSM 12
1927 "Notes on the Remains of an Old Boat from Pontian, Pahang" JFMSM 12, 93–6
1927 "Further Notes on Lenggong Negritos" JFMSM 12
1927 "Negrito Cave Drawings at Lenggong, Upper Perak" JFMSM 12
1928 "On Ancient Remains from Kuala Selinsing, Perak"  JFMSM 12(5)
1928 "Further Notes on Remains from Kuala Selinsing, Perak"  JFMSM 12(5)
1928 "Further excavations at Gunung Pondok" JFMSM 12, 136–142
1928 "Report on cave excavations in Perak" JFMSM 12 (6), 145–60 (with Pieter V van Stein Callenfels)
1928 "Schebesta and the Negritos" Man 28
1928 "Stone Celts from Northern Burma" Man 28 (February 1928), 25–26   
1929 "A Note on a Negrito Funeral" JFMSM 12
1929 "On slab-built graves in Perak" JFMSM 12, 111–120
1929 "Some Malay Pattern and Design" JFMSM 12, 163–167
1929 "A Further Note on the Kuala Selinsing Settlement" JFMSM, 12(7)
1929 "An Apology the Shade of Vaughan Stevens" JFMSM, 15
1929 "Gleanings from English Gypsies" Journal of Gypsy Lore Society New Series, 8(3), 140–142 
1929 "Two Anglo-Romani songs" Journal of Gypsy Lore Society Third Series, 8(3), 142–143 
1930 "Schebesta on the Sacerdo-Therapy of the Semangs"  Journal of the Royal Anthropological Institute of Great Britain and Ireland 60, 115–125
1930 "Notes on Recent Finds at Kuala Selinsing" JFMSM, 15(1)
1930 "An Unusual Type of Stone Implement from British North Borneo" Man 30 (July 1930), 123–124
1930 "Notes on two types of stone implements from the Malay Peninsula" Man 30, 157–159
1931 "Excavations at Nyong, Tembeling River, Pahang" JFMSM, 15, 51–2
1931 "A further slab-built grave at Singkai, Perak" JFMSM 15, 63–4
1931 "On Some Pottery Objects from Surat" Journal of the Siam Society 24 (2), 207–209
1931 "Stone Objects from Surat, Peninsular Siam" Journal of the Siam Society 24 (2)
1932 "Excavations at Tanjong Rawa, Kuala Selinsing, Perak" JFMSM, 15(3), 79–133
1934 "Courtship, Marriage, and Divorce in Borneo" in Readings in the Family by Lee M. Brooks, Ernest R. Groves, and Benjamin R. Andrews Chicago: J.B. Lippincott Company
1955 "Bajau pottery" Sarawak Museum Journal 6 (5): 297–300

Bibliography and sources
Horton, A. V. M. (ed) Bornean Diaries 1938–1942 I. H. N. Evans Borneo Research Council Monograph 6
King, Victor T. and Wilder, William D., The Modern Anthropology of South-East Asia: An Introduction, 47-8
Rahman,  Mohd. Kamaruzaman A., n.d.,   The Development of Archaeology in Malaya    Online at 
Obituary of I. H. N. Evans in Sarawak Museum Journal 8 (2), 18–19

References

British anthropologists
Ethnographers
Headhunting accounts and studies
British North Borneo
People from British Malaya
People from British Borneo
People educated at Charterhouse School
Alumni of Clare College, Cambridge
World War II civilian prisoners held by Japan
Internees at Batu Lintang camp
1886 births
1957 deaths
20th-century anthropologists